is a Japanese sprinter. He competed in the men's 100 metres and the men's 4 × 100 metres relay at the 1964 Summer Olympics.

References

External links
 

1940 births
Living people
Place of birth missing (living people)
Japanese male sprinters
Olympic male sprinters
Olympic athletes of Japan
Athletes (track and field) at the 1964 Summer Olympics
Asian Games medalists in athletics (track and field)
Asian Games silver medalists for Japan
Athletes (track and field) at the 1958 Asian Games
Medalists at the 1958 Asian Games
Japan Championships in Athletics winners
20th-century Japanese people
21st-century Japanese people